St Michael & All Angels' Church is an Anglican Church and the parish church of Winwick, Northamptonshire. It is a Grade II* listed building.

There was presumably a church at Winwick in 1086, when the Domesday Book records the presence of a priest there, although it does not mention a church building as such.

The main structure of the present building was erected in the 13th and 14th centuries, but the present chancel was built in 1853 to a design by E F Law. The church has a cruciform plan with a west tower. A detailed description appears on the Historic England website.

The parish registers survive from 1567, the historic registers being deposited at Northamptonshire Record Office.

Winwick is part of a united benefice along with Long Buckby, Watford and West Haddon. Each parish retains its own church building.

Notes

Grade II* listed churches in Northamptonshire
Church of England church buildings in Northamptonshire
13th-century church buildings in England
14th-century church buildings in England